Daniel Saffle Murray (born November 21, 1973) is a former Major League Baseball pitcher who played for two seasons. He pitched in one game for the New York Mets in 1999 and pitched in 14 games for the Kansas City Royals from 1999 to 2000.

External links

Pelota Binaria (Venezuelan Winter League)

1973 births
Living people
American expatriate baseball players in Mexico
Baseball players from California
Binghamton Mets players
Kansas City Royals players
Major League Baseball pitchers
Mexican League baseball pitchers
Navegantes del Magallanes players
American expatriate baseball players in Venezuela
New York Mets players
Norfolk Tides players
Oklahoma RedHawks players
Omaha Golden Spikes players
People from Los Alamitos, California
Pittsfield Mets players
Rieleros de Aguascalientes players
San Diego State Aztecs baseball players
St. Lucie Mets players
Tigres de Aragua players